CKZM-FM is a radio station which broadcasts at 94.1 MHz on the FM dial in St. Thomas, Ontario, Canada. It airs an adult contemporary format branded as 94.1 myFM.

It is owned by My Broadcasting Corporation, it was licensed by the CRTC on October 12, 2010.

MBC is a corporation controlled by Jon Pole and Andrew Dickson.

The Station began operations on Friday May 20, 2011 at 12:00 PM (noon).

References

External links
 94.1 myFM
 
 

KZM
KZM
St. Thomas, Ontario
Radio stations established in 2010
2010 establishments in Ontario
KZM